Carl-Wilhelm Reinhold de Boor (born 3 December 1937) is a German-American mathematician and professor emeritus at the University of Wisconsin–Madison.

In 1993, de Boor was elected as a member into the National Academy of Engineering for contributions to numerical analysis and methods in particular numerical tools used in computer-aided design.

Early life
Born in Stolp, Germany (now, as part of Poland, called Słupsk), as the seventh of eight children born to Werner (an anti-Nazi Lutheran minister) and Toni de Boor in 1937, he fled in 1945 with his family, settling eventually in Schwerin, then part of East Germany.  As a child, he was often ill, suffering from a variety of conditions. In 1955, young Carl took advantage of the temporary political thaw following Joseph Stalin's death in 1953, obtained a one-month visa to West Germany and biked there, then decided to stay when he learned there that his application to Humboldt University (in East Berlin) for the study of chemistry had been turned down (because of his poor performance in mathematics).  However, Otto Friedrich (a brother of Carl's father's first wife) was willing and able to help him. Two years later, he met and fell in love with Otto's niece, Matilda Friedrich, the daughter of Carl Friedrich, the political scientist and constitutional scholar.  With the support of the Friedrich family, Carl emigrated to the United States in 1959, learning English on his trip across the Atlantic (he could read Beatrix Potter when he boarded the boat).

Education and career

Having earned only a high school diploma after three and a half years of study at Hamburg University, de Boor entered Harvard University as a graduate student of mathematics. After working for a year as a research assistant to Garrett Birkhoff, he went to work for General Motors Research in Warren, Michigan, where he met splines. He received his first postgraduate degree, a Ph.D. from the University of Michigan, in 1966, and then became an assistant professor at Purdue University.  In 1972, he accepted a position as professor of mathematics and computer science at the University of Wisconsin–Madison, working out of the UW's Army Math Research Center, which had recently been bombed in opposition to the Vietnam War.

Research and teaching
A chief attraction of the UW job was the opportunity to work directly with Isaac Schoenberg, considered the father of splines, the piecewise polynomials de Boor would further develop.  In particular, he formulated a relatively fast and numerically stable algorithm for calculating the values of splines (used extensively in computer-aided design and computer graphics), and advocated for the formulation of spline functions in terms of the basis splines, or B-splines developed by Schoenberg and Curry.
He was a teacher, guiding numerous graduate students. He is the author of a number of works, including an introductory textbook on numerical analysis (with S.D. Conte) and a textbook on spline approximation. Carl has also worked with MATLAB extensively over the years and is the author of the Spline Toolbox.

Carl de Boor retired from the University of Wisconsin–Madison in 2003 and relocated to the Pacific Northwest, where he continues to work with colleagues on mathematical problems, and to travel.  He currently lives on Orcas Island, in Washington state, with his second wife, Helen Bee, author of texts in human development, to whom he has been married since 1991. In addition to his emeritus status at the University of Wisconsin–Madison, he is also an affiliated professor at the University of Washington.

de Boor has been listed as an ISI Highly Cited Author in Mathematics by the ISI Web of Knowledge, Thomson Scientific Company.

Awards
In 1997 he was elected to the National Academy of Sciences, and he received the 2003 National Medal of Science in mathematics.  Other honors have included election to the American Academy of Arts and Sciences in 1987 and the National Academy of Engineering in 1993, honorary degrees from Purdue University and Technion (the Israel Institute of Technology), as well as membership in the German Academy of Sciences Leopoldina in Germany and the Polish Academy of Science.  He won the John von Neumann Lecture Prize from the Society for Industrial and Applied Mathematics in 1996 and the John A. Gregory Award of Geometric Design in 2009.

Personal
Carl is a lover of music—especially classical, and more especially Johann Sebastian Bach—walks, good food, and games of all sorts. 
In 1981, he bought his first personal computer, an Apple II with 32KB of memory with an old reel-to-reel tape recorder hooked up to store programs. He required his children to write any computer games they wished to play. With them he wrote an accounting program for tracking his checkbook, which he kept using long after the kids went to college, though he had to edit the program to use the Z key for recording a new transaction when the R key finally wore out, as well as implementations of a number of his children's favorite board games.

He is a lover of the quirky and easily enthralled by art. He used to keep a print of The Garden of Earthly Delights in his dining room, to the distress of some of his children and others.

Carl learned to play the cornet, as a child, to combat asthma.  He was also fed a vast quantity of raw eggs, whipped with a sprinkle of sugar, supposedly to help strengthen him during his early, sickly years. As a father, he made his children eat such egg treats.

During his Madison years, he played the bass drum in the neighborhood Fourth of July parade, and each August celebrates his arrival in the United States, where he is a citizen.

References

 Carl de Boor's curriculum vitae
 Y.K. Leong,  Carl de Boor: On wings of splines, Imprints (newsletter of the Institute for Mathematical Sciences, National University of Singapore), Issue 5, 2004.

Selected publications by Carl de Boor:
 C. de Boor, On calculating with B-splines, J. Approx. Theory  6 (1972), 50–62.
 C. de Boor, A Practical Guide to Splines, Springer-Verlag, 1978.
 C. de Boor and S.D. Conte, Elementary numerical analysis, an algorithmic approach, McGraw-Hill, 1972 / 2000.
 C. de Boor, K. Hoellig and S. Riemenschneider, Box splines, Springer-Verlag, 1993.

1937 births
Living people
People from Słupsk
People from the Province of Pomerania
German emigrants to the United States
20th-century American mathematicians
21st-century American mathematicians
Numerical analysts
National Medal of Science laureates
University of Michigan alumni
University of Wisconsin–Madison faculty
Members of the United States National Academy of Sciences
Fellows of the Society for Industrial and Applied Mathematics
Members of the United States National Academy of Engineering
Members of the German Academy of Sciences Leopoldina